Brabourne Stadium is a cricket ground in Mumbai, India. It is the home of the Cricket Club of India and has played host to Ranji Trophy matches (including seventeen finals) and Indian Premier League matches, as well as being a Test, One Day International (ODI) and Twenty20 International (T20I) venue. It has a capacity of 20,000 spectators. The ground has hosted 18 Test matches, the first in 1948 when India played the West Indies. It has also staged nine ODI matches, the first of which was in 1989 when Australia lost to Pakistan by 66 runs. One T20I has been played at the ground when India beat Australia by seven wickets in 2007. This was also the first T20I to be played in India. Of the nine ODIs played at the stadium, five matches (including the final) were staged during the ICC Champions Trophy in 2006.

In cricket, a five-wicket haul (also known as a "five-for" or "fifer") refers to a bowler taking five or more wickets in a single innings. This is regarded as a notable achievement. The first bowler to take a five-wicket haul in a Test match at Brabourne Stadium was Prior Jones in 1949, for the West Indies against India. The first Indian to take a five-wicket haul in a Test at the Brabourne was Vinoo Mankad, who did so in a game against Pakistan in 1952. B. S. Chandrasekhar is the only bowler to have taken two five-wicket hauls in Test matches at the ground, doing so against the West Indies in 1966 and against England in 1973. Chandrasekhar is also the only bowler to have taken ten wickets in a match at Brabourne, he took eleven wickets against the West Indies in 1966. Twelve bowlers have taken thirteen five-wicket hauls at the ground. Sri Lankan bowler Farveez Maharoof's five wicket haul against the West Indies in 2006, is the only one achieved during an ODI. Khaleel Ahmed's three wickets for thirteen runs in a ODI versus West Indies in 2018 are the best figures by an Indian at the ground in the fifty over format. The best bowling figures in the only T20I staged at the ground featuring India and Australia in 2007 are Irfan Pathan's two wickets for thirty-four runs.

Key

Tests

One Day Internationals

References

Brabourne Stadium
Indian cricket lists